Alexander Grigoryevich Tyshler (26 July 1898 — 1980) was a Russian modernist painter, in particular, notable as a stage designer.

Early life 
Tyshler was born in 1898 in Melitopol, Taurida Governorate (now Zaporizhzhia Oblast, Ukraine) in a Jewish family. His father, Grigory Tyshler, was a joiner. In 1912, Tyshler was accepted in Kyiv Art School, which he graduated from in 1917. Soon afterwards, the Russian Civil War started, and he was unable to travel back to Melitopol. Tyshler stayed in Kiev and started to visit the workshop of Aleksandra Ekster which was also the place heavily visited by the intellectual elite of the city. In 1919, he signed up for the Red Army, and in 1920 he returned to Melitopol, where he married Anastasia Grozdova the same year. In 1921, Tyshler moved to Moscow.

Career 
In Moscow, Tyshler got close to futurist circles. He worked in painting and graphics, in particular, as a book illustrator. In this period, he was mostly interested in abstract compositions showing details of some mechanical equipment. On the other hand, the graphics was mainly figurative and, in particular, showed some themes related to the Civil War, as well as landscapes of Crimea. Starting from 1926, when Tyshler was invited to design a stage for a play in BelGOSET, the state Jewish theater in Minsk, he also started to work as a stage designer. His second stage design was for Fuenteovejuna by Lope de Vega. He was subsequently invited to the State Jewish Theater in Kharkiv, and, in the 1930s, to Romen Theatre in Moscow. Tyshler worked with Romen Theatre until 1940 and made the stage design for most of their performances of that period. In the 1930s, he also produced many paintings on topics associated with the Russian Revolution and Civil war, as well as related to the topis of his stage design, such as a large cyclus on Romani life. Tyshler's paintings before 1936 are considered the early period of his art.

Legacy 
Works by Tyshler are held in the collection of the Melitopol Museum of Local History.

References

1898 births
1980 deaths
People from Melitopol
People from Melitopolsky Uyezd
Ukrainian Jews
Russian painters